WXMD (89.7 MHz FM) is a Christian radio station licensed to California, Maryland, serving Southern Maryland.  The station is owned by Redeemer Broadcasting, Inc.

References

External links
 

XMD (FM)